The Saka-Satavahana Wars were a series of conflicts fought between the Saka ksatraps and the Satavahanas during the 1st-2nd century CE. Both sides achieved success at varying points during the conflicts, but in the end, it was the Satvahanas which prevailed. However, constant wars with the Sakas severely weakened them and was a major contributor in their fall.

Wars

First phase
The Saka ruler Bhumaka was succeeded by his son Nahapana who became a very powerful ruler. During 15-40 CE, he occupied portions of the Satavahana empire in western and central India. He is known to have ruled the former Satavahana territory, as attested by the inscriptions of his governor and son-in-law, Rishabhadatta. Nahapana  Nahapana held sway over Malwa, Southern Gujarat, and Northern Konkan, from Bharuch to Sopara and the Nasik and Poona districts.

It was probably during the reign of Satavahana king Sivasvati that the Kshaharatas invaded Northern Maharastra and Vidarbha and occupied the districts of Pune and Nashik, forcing the Satavahanas to abandon their capital Junnar and to move to Prastisthana (modern Paithan) in the vicinity of Aurangabad.

Second phase

 

The Satavahana power was revived by Gautamiputra Satakarni, who is considered the greatest of the Satavahana rulers. The king defeated by him appears to have been the Western Kshatrapa ruler Nahapana, as suggested by Nahapana's coins overstruck with names and titles of Gautamiputra. The Nashik prashasti inscription of Gautamiputra's mother Gautami Balashri, dated to the 20th year after his death, records his achievements. The Nashik prashasti inscription states that Gautamiputra uprooted the Kshaharata (or Khagarata) family, to which Nahapana belonged. The Nashik inscription dated to the 18th year of Gautamiputra's reign states that he reaffirmed a grant of land to Buddhist monks living at the Triraśmi peak. This land was earlier in the possession of Nahapana's son-in-law Rishabhadatta (also known as Ushavadata), who had donated it to the monks. He (Gautamiputra Satkarni) claimed victory on them in an inscription at Cave No. 3 of the Pandavleni Caves in Nashik:

Third phase
A satrap named Chastana founded the Kardamaka dynasty after Nahapana's death. His successor was probably his grandson, Rudradaman I. The Satavahanas were the aggressors of the next war. The conflict between Rudradaman I and Satavahanas became so gruelling, that in order to contain the conflict, a matrimonial relationship was concluded by giving Rudradaman's daughter to the Satavahana king Vashishtiputra Satakarni. The inscription relating the marriage between Rudradaman's daughter and Vashishtiputra Satakarni appears in a cave at Kanheri:

The Satavahanas and the Western Satraps remained at war however, and Rudradaman I defeated the Satavahanas twice in these conflicts, only sparing the life of Vashishtiputra Satakarni due to their family alliance:

Rudradaman regained all the previous territories held by Nahapana, probably with the exception of the southern areas of Poona and Nasik (epigraphical remains in these two areas at that time are exclusively Satavahana):

Fourth (last phase)
During the reign of satrap Rudrasimha I, Satavahana emperor Sri Yajna Sātakarni defeated the Western Satraps in the late 2nd century CE, thereby reconquering their southern regions in western and central India, which led to the temporary decline of the Western Satraps.

Result
The wars exhausted the resources of both kingdoms, especially the Satavahanas, which was a major factor in their decline. On the other hand, the Saka satraps would continue to prosper for the next two centuries, until their extinction by the Gupta Empire.

See also
Nahapana
Satavahana dynasty
Western Satraps
Rudradaman I
Sri Yajna Sātakarni

References

1st-century conflicts
2nd-century conflicts
Ancient empires and kingdoms of India
Wars involving ancient India